Vidya Academy of Science and Technology Technical Campus (VAST TC), is a privately financed engineering college in Thiruvananthapuram District in Kerala situated at Kilimanoor.The college offers a degree in Bachelor of Technology and courses in five branches of engineering -  Civil, Computer Science, Electrical and Electronics, Electronics and Communication, Mechanical. 
The college was established and is administered by Vidya International Charitable Trust (VICT), a body formed by more than a thousand non-resident Keralites mostly based in the Arab States of the Persian Gulf.

Vidya Academy of Science and Technology Technical Campus is accredited by NAAC with "B++" Grade in 2022.

See also 
 Vidya Academy of Science and Technology, Thrissur

References

External links
 Vidya Academy Kilimanoor, Official Website
 Vidya International Charitable Trust, Official Website

All India Council for Technical Education
Engineering colleges in Thiruvananthapuram
Private engineering colleges in Kerala
Vidya Academy of Science and Technology